Anna Vasilchikova (Анна Васильчикова) was Tsaritsa of the Tsardom of Russia and was the fifth spouse of Ivan the Terrible. (Иван Грозный)

Very little is known of her background. She married Ivan in January 1575 without the blessing of the Ecclesiastical Council of the Russian Orthodox Church. She was repudiated by her husband and made a nun in a monastery. The date of her death is uncertain, having been variously described as occurring in 1576–77.

References
 Troyat, Henri Ivan le Terrible. Flammarion, Paris, 1982
 de Madariaga, Isabel Ivan the Terrible. Giulio Einaudi editore, 2005

|-

|-

Wives of Ivan the Terrible
Russian nuns
1570s deaths
Year of birth unknown